Matthew Quinn Johnson (born September 9, 1992) is an American football coach and former quarterback, who is currently the offensive coordinator and quarterbacks coach for the Kent State Golden Flashes. He played college football for the Bowling Green Falcons.

College career
As a redshirt sophomore in 2013, he passed for 3,467 yards and 25 touchdowns. Johnson was named the MVP of the 2013 MAC Championship after he led the Falcons past the undefeated and nationally ranked NIU Huskies. His 2014 season was cut short by a broken hip in the first game of the season against Western Kentucky. As a senior in the 2015 season, he completed 383 passes of 569 passes for 4,946 yards with 46 touchdowns and eight interceptions.

Professional career
On April 26, 2017, Johnson signed with the Hamilton Tiger-Cats.

He was released on June 12, 2017.

References

External links
Kent State profile
Bowling Green Falcons bio

1992 births
Living people
American football quarterbacks
Bowling Green Falcons football players
Kent State Golden Flashes football coaches
Players of American football from Harrisburg, Pennsylvania
Sportspeople from Harrisburg, Pennsylvania